Events from the year 1968 in Iran.

Incumbents
 Shah: Mohammad Reza Pahlavi 
 Prime Minister: Amir-Abbas Hoveida

Events

31 August – The first in a destructive earthquake doublet affected eastern Iran. The 7.4  Dasht-e Bayaz earthquake shook the area with a maximum Mercalli intensity of X (Extreme). Fifteen-thousand people were killed.
1 September – The second in the sequence, the 6.4  Ferdows earthquake, destroyed many villages, including Ferdows. Nine-hundred people were killed.

Births

 2 June – Navid Negahban.

Full date unknown
Shiva Mahbobi, political activist

Deaths

 7 January  – Gholamreza Takhti.
 4 April  – Muhammad Taha al-Huwayzi.

See also
 Years in Iraq
 Years in Afghanistan

References

 
Iran
Years of the 20th century in Iran
1960s in Iran
Iran